Middletown is an independent, home rule-class city in Jefferson County, Kentucky, United States, and a former neighborhood of Louisville. The population was 7,218 at the 2010 census.

The city is also home to the main campus of the largest church in the state (and one of the country's largest Protestant churches), the Southeast Christian Church.

History
The City of Middletown was originally incorporated in 1797 by the Jefferson County Court on 500 acres of land lying on a branch of the forks of Beargrass Creek that originally belonged to Jacob Meyers and Culberth Harrison. Though there is no recorded explanation why the city was named Middletown, it is commonly believed that that name was chosen because the town was in the "middle" of the two older cities of Louisville which was founded June 24, 1778, and Shelbyville, which was founded December 20, 1792. In 1871 the Kentucky General Assembly amended the original charter to increase Middletown's boundaries.

After failing to hold elections and collect taxes after 1919, Circuit Judge McCauley Smith dissolved the city's charter on July 26, 1960, and Middletown lost its 163-year-old city status. The city's charter was restored as a sixth-class city on August 7, 1976 with a commission form of government. On July 15, 1982, this was upgraded to the status of a fourth-class city.

Geography
Middletown is located at  (38.243342, -85.530842). in northeast Jefferson County, Kentucky near Louisville, Kentucky.

Demographics

2010
As of the census of 2010, there were 7,218 people, 3,292 households, and 1,966 families living in the city. The racial makeup of the city was 87.1% White (85.1% non-Hispanic), 7.1% African American, 0.11% Native American or Alaska Native, 2.8% Asian, 0.07% Pacific Islander, 0.87% from other races, and 1.9% from two or more races. Hispanics or Latinos of any race were 3.2% of the population.

There were 3,292 households, out of which 26.7% had children under the age of 18 living with them, 45.4% were married couples living together, 11.5% had a female householder with no husband present, 2.9% had a male householder with no wife present, and 40.3% were non-families. 35.4% of all households were made up of individuals, and 16.6% had someone living alone who was 65 years of age or older. The average household size was 2.19 and the average family size was 2.86.

The age distribution was 21.4% under 18, 5.7% from 18 to 24, 24.3% from 25 to 44, 30.2% from 45 to 64, and 18.4% who were 65 or older. The median age was 43.8 years. For every 100 females, there were 85.6 males. For every 100 females age 18 and over, there were 80.0 males.

2000 census
As of the census of 2000, there were 5,744 people, 2,391 households, and 1,654 families living in the city. The racial makeup of the city was 90.39% White, 5.54% African American, 0.30% Native American or Alaska Native, 1.44% Asian, 0.09% Pacific Islander, 0.66% from other races, and 1.58% from two or more races. Hispanics or Latinos of any race were 1.50% of the population.

There were 2,391 households, out of which 33.0% had children under the age of 18 living with them, 55.7% were married couples living together, 11.2% had a female householder with no husband present, and 30.8% were non-families. 26.9% of all households were made up of individuals, and 9.5% had someone living alone who was 65 years of age or older. The average household size was 2.40 and the average family size was 2.92.

The age distribution was 24.8% under the age of 18, 6.4% from 18 to 24, 31.1% from 25 to 44, 25.6% from 45 to 64, and 12.1% who were 65 years of age or older. The median age was 38 years. For every 100 females, there were 90.1 males. For every 100 females age 18 and over, there were 84.5 males.

The median income for a household in the city was $53,608, and the median income for a family was $61,667. Males had a median income of $45,417 versus $33,135 for females. The per capita income for the city was $26,660. About 2.3% of families and 4.1% of the population were below the poverty line, including 3.6% of those under age 18 and 8.0% of those age 65 or over.

Education
Public education in Middletown is administered by Jefferson County Public Schools, which operates Eastern High School, Hite Elementary, Middletown Elementary, and Crosby Middle School in the Middletown area. Middletown also has multiple privately funded schools. There is also a branch of the Louisville Free Public Library.

Government Services

Anchorage-Middletown-Eastwood-Worthington fire and EMS operates out of 11 stations to provide fire protection to 90 square miles of the eastern Louisville Metro area. Middletown is also home to a small 24 hour paid police department based out of city hall. Middletown is also home to LMPD’s 8th division. EMS is serviced by the fire department and Louisville 
metro EMS.

References

External links
City website
Chamber of Commerce

"Middletown: As a Prime Stagecoach Stop, the Community Saw Much of Its Activity Centered on Two Thriving Inns" — Article by Kay Stewart of The Courier-Journal

 
Cities in Kentucky
Louisville metropolitan area
1797 establishments in Kentucky